Alexia "Lexi" Hamilton (born 19 October 2000) is a professional Australian rules footballer who plays for Sydney in the AFL Women's (AFLW), having previously played for the Gold Coast Suns and for North Melbourne. Alexia also previously was a member of the Australian Judo team, competing in the 2017 Cadet World Championships,  Santiago, Chile.

Early Life
Hamilton was born and raised in Canberra in the Australian Capital Territory.  She played her junior and senior football with the Queanbeyan Tigers before going on to play with the Canberra Football Club in the NEAFL competition and joining the GWS Giants Academy program. Hamilton also is a student at the Australian Catholic University, in which she studies a double degree in Nursing and Paramedicine.

AFLW career
Hamilton was drafted by Gold Coast with their third selection and thirty-eighth overall in the 2019 AFL Women's draft. She made her debut against  at Blacktown ISP Oval in the opening round of the 2020 season. In August 2020 during the COVID-19 pandemic, she was delisted and returned to Canberra. In late 2021, Alexia was resigned by North Melbourne and played 2 games during their 2022 campaign. In May 2022, Hamilton joined expansion club Sydney and played 10 games.

References

External links 

2000 births
Living people
Gold Coast Football Club (AFLW) players
Australian rules footballers from the Australian Capital Territory
North Melbourne Football Club (AFLW) players
Sydney Swans (AFLW) players